The participation of Turkey in the ABU TV Song Festival has occurred seven times since the inaugural ABU TV Song Festival began in 2012. Since their début in 2014, the Turkish entry has been organised by the national broadcaster Turkish Radio and Television Corporation (TRT).

History
TRT made their debut in the ABU TV Song Festivals at 2014 which was hosted at The Venetian Theatre, in Macau, China

Participation overview

Hostings

See also
 Turkey in the Eurovision Song Contest
 Turkey in the Türkvizyon Song Contest

References 

Countries at the ABU Song Festival